α-Methylhistamine is a histamine agonist selective for the receptor subtype H3. It causes lowering of blood pressure and a decrease of heart rate in animal models.

References 

Imidazoles
Amines
Histamine agonists